Stanislav Micinski (1 November 1899 – 7 January 1955) was a Romanian footballer who played as a striker.

International career
Stanislav Micinski played one match for Romania, on 3 September 1922 under coach Teofil Morariu in a friendly which ended 1–1 against Poland.

References

External links
 

1899 births
1955 deaths
Romanian footballers
Romania international footballers
Place of birth missing
Association football forwards
Liga I players